is a former Japanese football player.

Club statistics

References

External links

1985 births
Living people
Association football people from Ehime Prefecture
Japanese footballers
J2 League players
Sagan Tosu players
Association football forwards